Humboldt County is a county located in the U.S. state of California. As of the 2020 census, the population was 136,463. The county seat is Eureka.

Humboldt County comprises the Eureka–Arcata–Fortuna, California, Micropolitan Statistical Area. It has among the most diverse climates of United States counties, with very mild coastal summers and hot interior days. Similar to the greater region, summers are extremely dry and winters have substantial rainfall.

Its primary population centers of Eureka, the site of College of the Redwoods main campus, and the smaller college town of Arcata, site of California State Polytechnic University, Humboldt, are located adjacent to Humboldt Bay, California's second largest natural bay. Area cities and towns are known for hundreds of ornate examples of Victorian architecture.

History
The original inhabitants of the area now known as Humboldt County include the Algic Wiyot, Yurok; the Hokan Karuk; and the Athapaskan Hupa, Chilula, Whilkut, Tsnungwe as well as the Eel River Athapaskan peoples, including the Wailaki, Mattole and Nongatl. 

Spanish traders made unintended visits to California with the Manila Galleons on their return trips from the Philippines beginning in 1565. The first recorded entry by people of European origin was a landing by the Spanish in 1775 in Trinidad.

The first recorded entry of Humboldt Bay by non-natives was an 1806 visit from a sea otter hunting party from Sitka employed by the Russian American Company. The hunting party included Captain Jonathan Winship, an American, and some Aleut hunters. The bay was not visited again by people of European origin until 1849 when Josiah Gregg's party visited. In 1850, Douglas Ottinger and Hans Buhne entered the bay, naming it Humboldt in honor of the great naturalist and explorer, Alexander von Humboldt, and the name was later applied to the county as a whole.

The area around Humboldt Bay was once solely inhabited by the Wiyot Indian tribe. One of the largest Wiyot villages, Tolowot, was located on Indian Island in Humboldt Bay. It was the site of the February 26, 1860 massacre of the Wiyot people that was recorded by Bret Harte, then living in Union, now called Arcata. Between 60 and 200 Wiyot men, women, and children were murdered that night in the midst of a religious ceremony. Tolowot is now a restricted site and a National Historic Landmark. In 2019, the island was restored to the Wiyot tribe, and is now known as Tuluwat or Duluwat island.

Humboldt County was formed in 1853 from parts of Trinity County. 

State historic landmarks in Humboldt County include Arcata and Mad River Railroad, California's First Drilled Oil Wells in Petrolia, Camp Curtis, Centerville Beach Cross, the city of Eureka, the victorian town of Ferndale, Fort Humboldt, Humboldt Harbor Historical District, the Jacoby Building, The Old Arrow Tree, Old Indian Village of Tsurai, the Town of Trinidad, and Trinidad Head.

On February 5 and 6, 1885, Eureka's entire Chinese population of 300 men and 20 women were expelled after a gunfight between rival Chinese gangs (tongs) resulted in the wounding of a 12-year-old boy and the death of 56-year-old David Kendall, a Eureka City Councilman. After the shooting, an angry mob of 600 Eureka residents met and informed the Chinese that they were no longer wanted in Eureka and would be hanged if they were to stay in town longer than 3 p.m. the next day. They were put on two steamships and shipped to San Francisco. No one was killed in the expulsion. Another Chinese expulsion occurred during 1906 in a cannery on the Eel River, in which 23 Chinese cannery workers were expelled after objections to their presence. However, some Chinese remained in the Orleans area, where some white landowners sheltered and purchased food for the Chinese mineworkers until after racial tension passed. Chinese did not return to the coastal cities until the 1950s.

Geography

Cape Mendocino is the westernmost point in California (longitude 124 degrees, 24 minutes, 30 seconds). Humboldt Bay, the only deepwater port between San Francisco and Coos Bay, Oregon, is located on the coast at the midpoint of the county.

Humboldt County contains a diversity of plant and animal species, with significant forest and coastal habitats. In coastal areas there are extensive redwood forests. A prominent understory shrub is the toyon, whose northern range limit is in Humboldt County.

Rivers

Humboldt County's major rivers include (in order of flow – cubic meters per second – from largest to smallest):
 Klamath River
 Eel River
 Trinity River
 Mad River

The smaller rivers include Redwood Creek, significant due to amount of its flow; the Van Duzen; the Eel River syncline group composed of the South Fork, the North Fork, and the Salt River; the Mattole, Salmon, Elk, Bear, and Little rivers.

Seismic activity
Historically, Humboldt County and the entire far north coast have had many earthquakes over 6.0 magnitude.

The 1992 Cape Mendocino earthquakes were a series of three major earthquakes that occurred off the coast of Cape Mendocino, California on April 25 and 26, 1992, the largest being a 7.2. Ninety-five people were injured and property in the county sustained considerable damage.

In 2022, a 6.4 magnitude earthquake centered approximately 10 miles (16 km) from Ferndale caused damage, especially in Rio Dell.

The town of Arcata is built on top of an accretionary wedge. This was formed by the subduction of the Gorda plate under the North American plate.

Climate
The coastal zone of the county experiences very wet, cool winters and dry, mild foggy summers. In the populated areas and cities near the coast, the highest temperatures tend to occur at locations just a few miles inland from Eureka and Arcata, in towns like Fortuna, Rio Dell, and smaller unincorporated communities located somewhat further away from Humboldt Bay. The coastal zone experiences a number of frosty nights in winter and early spring, though snowfall and hard freezes are rare. Coastal winters are cool and wet. Winter rainstorms are frequent, with averages from  a year, depending upon elevation.

Inland areas of the county also experience wet, cool winters. Snowfall is common at elevations over  throughout the winter months, and is deep enough at higher elevations to have inspired the opening of a small ski lift operation (now defunct) on Horse Mountain, near Willow Creek, for several decades in the late 20th century. Summer displays the sharpest difference between the coastal and inland climates. Inland regions of Humboldt County experience highs of  depending on the elevation and distance from the ocean.

Demographics

2000
As of the 2000 census, the population of Humboldt County was 126,518. As of that census, there were 51,238 households in Humboldt County, and the population density was 35 people per square mile (14/km2). By 2006, the population was projected to have increased to 131,361 by the California Department of Finance. There were 55,912 housing units at an average density of 16 per square mile (6/km2). The racial makeup of the county was 84.7% White, 0.9% Black or African American, 5.7% Native American, 1.7% Asian, 0.2% Pacific Islander, 2.5% from other races, and 4.4% from two or more races. In 2017, 11.7% of the population were Hispanic or Latino according to the United States Census Bureau. 13.3% were of German, 10.7% Irish, 10.3% English, 7.4% American and 5.7% Italian ancestry according to Census 2000. 92.1% spoke English and 4.6% spoke Spanish as their first language.

There were 51,238 households, out of which 28.5% had children under the age of 18 living with them, 43.1% were married couples living together, 11.8% had a female householder with no husband present, and 40.2% were non-families. 28.9% of all households were made up of individuals, and 9.2% had someone living alone who was 65 years of age or older. The average household size was 2.39 and the average family size was 2.95.

In the county, the population was spread out, with 23.2% under the age of 18, 12.4% from 18 to 24, 27.4% from 25 to 44, 24.5% from 45 to 64, and 12.5% who were 65 years of age or older. The median age was 36 years. For every 100 females there were 97.7 males. For every 100 females age 18 and over, there were 95.6 males.

The median income for a household in the county was $31,226, and the median income for a family was $39,370. Males had a median income of $32,210 versus $23,942 for females. The per capita income for the county was $17,203. About 12.9% of families and 19.5% of the population were below the poverty line, including 22.5% of those under age 18 and 7.2% of those age 65 or over.

2010

The 2010 United States Census reported that Humboldt County had a population of 134,623. The racial makeup of Humboldt County was 109,920 (81.7%) White, 1,505 (1.1%) African American, 7,726 (5.7%) Native American, 2,944 (2.2%) Asian, 352 (0.3%) Pacific Islander, 5,003 (3.7%) from other races, and 7,173 (5.3%) from two or more races. Hispanic or Latino of any race were 13,211 persons (9.8%).

2011

Places by population, race, and income

Lead (2017–18) 

Humboldt County children are at greater risk of dangerously elevated blood lead levels than Flint, Michigan's – and almost double that of any other California county measured. The cases are concentrated in Eureka's Old Town and downtown areas.

Economy
Humboldt County is known for its impressive redwood trees, and many acres of private redwood timberland make Humboldt the top timber producer in California. The lush river bottoms adjacent to the ocean produce rich, high-quality dairy products. Somewhat further inland, the warmer valleys have historically produced abundant apples and other fruit. More recently vineyards have been planted in the Trinity, Klamath, Mattole and upper Eel river areas.

Locally based companies

Dairy
Humboldt County is known for its family-operated dairy farms. The Humboldt Creamery, a significant producer of high-grade ice cream and other dairy products, operates from the original headquarters located at Fernbridge adjacent to the Eel River.

Cannabis

As part of the Emerald Triangle, Humboldt County is known for its cultivation of cannabis, estimated to be worth billions of dollars. Proposition 215 allows patients and caregivers who are given a doctor's recommendation to legally (State level only) grow up to 99 plants in Humboldt County. However, in the years before Prop 215 (early 1970s – late 1980s), Humboldt County saw a large migration of the Bay Area counter-culture to the region. Many came looking to purchase cheap land, and ended up growing marijuana to pay for their land. Especially around Garberville and Redway, the rural culture and hippie scene eventually collaborated to create a rural hippie community in which marijuana became the center of the economy and the culture. Many people prospered by producing marijuana for California and other states because of its reputation for quality. A Redway radio station, KMUD, in the past has issued warnings and alerts to the region with information on whereabouts of law enforcement on their way to raid marijuana gardens.

The Campaign Against Marijuana Planting is the multi-agency law enforcement task force managed by the California Department of Justice, formed with the prime purpose of eradicating illegal cannabis production in California. The operations began in the late 1970s, named the Northern California Sinsemilla Strike Force in 1979, but the name CAMP became used after its official establishment in 1983. While the influence of CAMP in Humboldt County has waned with decriminalization of marijuana, there is a renewed interest at the state level regarding valid growing permits and environmental concerns. As a result, CAMP is today still used as a policing body, in accordance with the DEA. Yearly CAMP reports, published by the California Department of Justice, Bureau of Narcotic Enforcement (BNE) are available online through Cal Poly Humboldt's Special Collections. Starting in 1983, the annual reports detail the organizational structure and names of individual participants, a summary of the season's activities, tactics, and mention of special successes, trends and hazards.

County officials and the industry have encountered challenges in the transition from an illegal, underground economy to legal recreational cannabis sales that began in California in 2018.

Parks and recreation

National protected areas
National Park
 Redwood National and State Parks – National Park Service

Conservation area
 King Range National Conservation Area and The Lost Coast – Bureau of Land Management

Recreation area
 Samoa Dunes Recreation Area – Bureau of Land Management

Forests
 Headwaters Forest Reserve – Bureau of Land Management
 Six Rivers National Forest – U.S. Forest Service
 Trinity National Forest – U.S. Forest Service

Wildlife refuge
 Humboldt Bay National Wildlife Refuge – Bureau of Land Management and U.S. Fish and Wildlife Service

State protected areas
Beaches
 Little River State Beach
 Trinidad State Beach

Parks
 Fort Humboldt State Historic Park
 Grizzly Creek Redwoods State Park
 Humboldt Lagoons State Park
 Humboldt Redwoods State Park
 Sue-meg State Park
 Prairie Creek Redwoods State Park
 Richardson Grove State Park
 Sinkyone Wilderness State Park

Tide pools
 Sue-meg State Park
 Moonstone Beach
 Indian Beach (also known as Old Home Beach)

Recreation areas
 Benbow State Recreation Area
 Harry A. Merlo State Recreation Area

Reserves
 Azalea State Reserve
 John B. Dewitt Redwoods State Reserve

County parks

  A. W. Way
  Big Lagoon County Park
 Centerville Beach
 Clam Beach
  Crab Park
  Freshwater County Park
  Hammond Trail
  Luffenholtz Beach
  Mad River, California
  Margarite Lockwood
  Moonstone Beach
  Van Duzen Pamplin Grove

Arts and culture
 The Sequoia Park Zoo is the oldest zoo in California operating on a  facility operated by the City of Eureka in  Sequoia Park.
 The Clarke Historical Museum in Eureka, displays North Coast regional and cultural history in the repurposed Historic Register Bank of Eureka building.
 The Ferndale Museum, in Ferndale, houses and exhibits artifacts, documents and papers from settlement during the California Gold Rush to the 1950s covering the lower Eel River Valley.
 The Morris Graves Museum of Art conserves and displays the works of local artists in a restored Carnegie Library building.
 The Ferndale Repertory Theatre is the county's oldest theater company; it has been in operation since 1972 at the Hart Theater building in Ferndale.
  The Humboldt Crabs, founded in 1945, are the oldest continuously operated summer collegiate, wood-bat baseball team in the country.
 See also the List of museums in the North Coast (California).

Government

Overview

Election audits in the county since 2008 have used a distinctive system which has spread elsewhere. They scan all ballots and release a file of the images with a digital signature, so candidates and the public can recount to find if the official totals are correct. They also release software to let the public tally the images electronically. The first time they did this they found the official software omitted 200 ballots.

Voter registration

Cities by population and voter registration

Party preferences 
From 1920 to 1984, the county was a noted bellwether area, voting for the national winner of every Presidential election. Since 1988, Humboldt has swung heavily to the Democratic Party at the Presidential and congressional levels, and is now one of the most Democratic areas in the state outside the Bay Area and Southern California. The last Republican presidential candidate to win a majority in the county was Ronald Reagan, a Californian, in 1984.

In the late 1990s and early 2000s, Humboldt also had a substantial number of people affiliated with the Green Party, but that number has declined in recent years; however, the Green Party has had its best performance by presidential and gubernatorial candidates of any county in the United States in Humboldt County, with Jill Stein gaining her largest county-level number of votes in Humboldt in 2016.

Crime 

Humboldt County is known for an unusual number of missing person cases. It was highlighted as part of the 2018 Netflix documentary Murder Mountain.

The following table includes the number of incidents reported and the rate per 1,000 persons for each type of offense.

Cities by population and crime rates

Education
The List of schools in Humboldt County, California shows the many school districts, including charter and private schools, at the elementary and high school level. Post-secondary education is offered locally at the College of the Redwoods and California State Polytechnic University, Humboldt (Cal Poly Humboldt). Blue Lake's Dell'Arte International School of Physical Theatre offers accredited three-year Masters of Fine Arts degrees in Ensemble Based Physical Theatre. Humboldt County has the lowest starting teacher pay scale in the whole state of California.

Media

Print
The Times-Standard is the only daily newspaper in the region; in continuous publication since 1854, and owned by Media News Group since 1996, They also print three weeklies: the Redwood Times, the Tri-City Weekly, and Northcoast 101. Other local publications include The Independent, the North Coast Journal, the Ferndale Enterprise, the Two Rivers Tribune, the Isis Scrolls, and The Lumberjack. The Arcata Eye  and the McKinleyville Press merged in August 2013 to form the Mad River Union.

Television
Humboldt County's locally produced television stations, NBC station KIEM and PBS station KEET, are based in Eureka. KIEM produces the only local TV newscast and KEET is the only PBS station in the region. Since 2017, CBS affiliate KVIQ has been a low-powered station operated as part of a duopoly with KIEM, sharing the same studios.

Fox affiliate KBVU, a semi-satellite of KCVU, is based in Chico and ABC affiliate KAEF, a semi-satellite of KRCR-TV, is based in Redding. In previous decades all major networks had production capacity in Eureka.

Local internet media
Locally internet based media include:

Lost Coast Outpost
Red Headed Black Belt

Radio

For-profit

KATA
KEKA,
KFMI
KEJB
KHUM
KINS-FM
KISS
KKHB
KLGE
KRED
KSLG-FM
KWPT
KWSW

Non-profit

KIDE
KHSU
KKDS-LP
KMUD
KMUE
KNHM
KNHT
KRFH-LP

Community media
Community broadband networks and public, educational, and government access (PEG) cable TV channels provide air time for local voices on Access Humboldt. Cable TV channels are carried by Suddenlink Communications and local programs are provided online through the Community Media Archive. The Digital Redwoods initiative of Access Humboldt is developing local networks to meet comprehensive community needs, including public, education and government purposes.

Transportation

Major highways

  U.S. Route 101
  State Route 36
  State Route 96
  State Route 169
  State Route 200
  State Route 211
  State Route 254 – Avenue of the Giants
  State Route 255
  State Route 271
  State Route 283
  State Route 299

Public transportation
 Humboldt Transit Authority operates two fixed route transit bus systems:
 Redwood Transit System provides intercity service to and within communities between Trinidad and Garberville, including Manila, King Salmon, Field's Landing, Loleta, Fernbridge and Fortuna. HTA also offers service between McKinleyville or Arcata and Willow Creek and an express bus between Arcata and College of the Redwoods when classes are in session.
 Eureka Transit Service, operated in the City of Eureka, provides local service on four scheduled routes (one hour headway) in Eureka and its adjacent unincorporated communities. Connections can be made to the Redwood Transit System at several places in Eureka.
 Arcata and Mad River Transit System, operated by the City of Arcata with funding from Cal Poly Humboldt. A&MRTS provides fixed route local bus service on two scheduled routes (one hour headway) in Arcata and an additional route between the Valley West Neighborhood and the university when classes are in session.
 The city of Blue Lake and the Blue Lake Rancheria operates the Blue Lake Rancheria Transit Authority. This provides fixed route intercity transit bus service (one hour headway) between Arcata and the Blue Lake Rancheria Indian Reservation and casino and local service within the city of Blue Lake.
 Del Norte County's Redwood Coast Transit operates fixed route intercity transit bus service between Arcata and Crescent City or Smith River.
 Amtrak Thruway bus has stops in many towns in the region, including Eureka, Arcata, and Fortuna. These stops are not managed by Amtrak and therefore have no services beyond serving passengers. Full service is only provided at the train station in Martinez, near San Francisco.

Airports
Arcata-Eureka Airport is located in McKinleyville (north of Arcata). Commercial flights are available. Other general aviation airports are located at Dinsmore, Garberville, Kneeland, Murray Field (Eureka), Samoa Field and Rohnerville (Fortuna).

Seaport
The Port of Humboldt Bay is on Humboldt Bay, California's second largest natural bay.

Events

In popular culture

Filming location

Ferndale, in southern Humboldt county, has been featured in such movies as The Majestic and Outbreak. It has appeared in made-for-television movies including Salem’s Lot, A Death in Canaan, and Joe Dirt. It was also the location of the iconic “I'm a Pepper” commercial for Dr. Pepper.

Additionally the following films were shot in Ferndale: the science fiction horror cult film She Demons (1958), the award winning short film Nonnie & Alex (1995), and the comedy-drama Kingdom Come (2001).

TV shows
Much of The WB's Hyperion Bay and the CBS show Blue Skies as well as an episode of Moonlighting were filmed in Humboldt County. The infamous Patterson-Gimlin film was filmed on Bluff Creek near Orleans, California.

Humboldt County has also been the subject of multiple documentary miniseries including Discovery Channel's Pot Cops and Netflix's Murder Mountain.

Humboldt County has also been featured in episodes of On the Case with Paula Zahn, The Profit, Hamilton's Pharmacopeia, Top Gear, The Tonight Show with Jay Leno, Survivorman, Diners, Drive-ins and Dives, Finding Bigfoot, Treehouse Masters, Rescue 911, Walking With Dinosaurs, Somebody's Gotta Do It, Monsters Resurrected, Weediquette, Dan Rather Reports, Monster Fish, Beachfront Bargain Hunt, and many more.

Ferndale was featured by Huell Howser in Road Trip Episode 149.

Humboldt County has also been the filming location for countless national television advertisements, including many major car commercials.

The Netflix series Virgin River is set in Humboldt County.

Books
In the book Lolita by Vladimir Nabokov there is a possible pun using the county's name (Humboldt) in connection to the main character's name (Humbert Humbert). This appears on page 108: "With the help of a guidebook I located [The Enchanted Hunters inn] in the secluded town of Briceland." This 'secluded town' could very well be a reference to the unincorporated Briceland of Humboldt County, making The Enchanted Hunters in 'Humboldt Land', continuing the novel's grotesque fairy-tale veneer.

Communities

Cities

 Arcata
 Blue Lake
 Eureka (county seat)
 Ferndale
 Fortuna
 Rio Dell
 Trinidad

Census-designated places

 Alderpoint
 Bayview
 Benbow
 Big Lagoon
 Cutten
 Fairhaven
 Fieldbrook
 Fields Landing
 Garberville
 Hoopa
 Humboldt Hill
 Hydesville
 Indianola
 Loleta
 McKinleyville
 Manila
 Miranda
 Myers Flat
 Myrtletown
 Orick
 Phillipsville
 Pine Hills
 Redcrest
 Redway
 Samoa
 Scotia
 Shelter Cove
 Wautec
 Weitchpec
 Weott
 Westhaven-Moonstone
 Willow Creek

Other unincorporated communities

 Alton
 Bayside
 Blocksburg
 Briceland
 Bridgeville
 Carlotta
 Cooks Valley
 Dinsmore
 Dyerville
 Elk River
 Englewood
 Fernbridge
 Fort Seward
 Freshwater
 Freshwater Corners
 Fruitland
 Glendale
 Holmes
 Honeydew
 Johnsons
 King Salmon
 Kneeland
 Korbel
 Maple Creek
 Moonstone
 Orleans
 Patricks Point
 Pepperwood
 Petrolia
 Pine Hill
 Port Kenyon
 Ridgewood Heights
 Riverside Park
 Rohnerville
 Rosewood
 Shively
 Stafford
 Sunny Brae
 Westhaven
 Whitethorn

Indian reservations
Humboldt County has eight Indian reservations lying within its borders. Only four other counties in the United States have more: San Diego County, California; Sandoval County, New Mexico; Riverside County, California; and Mendocino County, California. The Hoopa Valley Indian Reservation is the largest in the state of California, a state that generally has small reservations (although numerous) relative to those in other states.
 Big Lagoon Rancheria
 Blue Lake Rancheria
 Hoopa Valley Indian Reservation
 Karuk Indian Reservation (partly in Siskiyou County)
 Rohnerville Rancheria
 Table Bluff Rancheria
 Cher-Ae Heights Indian Community of the Trinidad Rancheria
 Yurok Indian Reservation (partly in Del Norte County)

Population ranking

The population ranking of the following table is based on the 2010 census of Humboldt County.

† county seat

Notable people 

 Sara Bareilles
 Lloyd Bridges
 Hobart Brown
 Becky Chambers
 Wesley Chesbro
 David Cobb
 Alexander Cockburn
 Trevor Dunn
 Guy Fieri
 Michael John Fles
 Brendan Fraser
 Robert A. Gearheart
 James Gillett
 Ulysses S. Grant
 Steven Hackett
 Bret Harte
 Dan Hauser
 El Hefe
 Julia Butterfly Hill
 Christa Johnson
 Howard B. Keck
 Seth Kinman
 Naomi Lang
 Rey Maualuga
 Pamela McGee
 Tim McKay
 Mike Patton
 Maurice Purify
 Nate Quarry
 Eric Rofes
 Stephen W. Shaw
 Steve Sillett
 Trey Spruance
 Greg Stafford
 Robert M. Viale
 Don Van Vliet
 Stephen Girard Whipple
 Ned Yost

See also

 Arcata and Eureka Community Recycling Centers
 Arcata Jacoby Creek Community Forest
 Arcata Marsh and Wildlife Sanctuary
 HSU First Street Gallery
 Humboldt Arts Council
 Humboldt County Historical Society
 Humboldt Crabs
 National Register of Historic Places listings in Humboldt County, California
 Operation Green Sweep
 California State Polytechnic University, Humboldt
 Lost Man Creek Dam
 Sequoia County, California

Notes

References

Further reading

External links

 
 Humboldt Economic Index
 All About Living in Humboldt County 
 General Guide to Humboldt County

 
1853 establishments in California
Alexander von Humboldt
California counties
Populated places established in 1853